The fifth season of The Bachelorette Australia premiered on Network 10 on Wednesday, 9 October 2019. The season features Angie Kent, a 29-year-old marketing and production assistant and former Gogglebox Australia star from Sydney, courting 21 men.

The first episode involved a twist with an undercover intruder, Angie's brother Brad Kent (under an anonymous name Mark), a personal trainer, entering the mansion to gain an insight into the other contestants.

Contestants
Three contestants, Ciarran, Timm and Jamie, were revealed by Network 10 on social media prior to the full cast being revealed.

The season began with 20 contestants which were revealed on 6 October 2019. In episode 3, Ryan entered the competition as an intruder, bringing the total number of contestants to 21.

Call-Out Order

Colour Key

	
 The contestant received the first impression "yellow rose", having the opportunity to spend 24 hours alone with Kent on the first date.
 The contestant received a rose during a date.
 The contestant received a rose during the rose ceremony or outside of a date.
 The contestant was eliminated outside the rose ceremony.
 The contestant was eliminated during a date.
 The contestant was eliminated.
 The contestant quit the competition. 
 The contestant won the competition.

Notes

Episodes

Episode 1
Original airdate: 9 October 2019

Episode 2
Original airdate: 10 October 2019

Episode 3
Original airdate: 16 October 2019

Episode 4
Original airdate: 17 October 2019

Episode 5
Original airdate: 23 October 2019

Episode 6
Original airdate: 24 October 2019

Episode 7
Original airdate: 30 October 2019

Episode 8
Original airdate: 31 October 2019

Episode 9
Original airdate: 6 November 2019

Episode 10
Original airdate: 7 November 2019

Episode 11
Original airdate: 13 November 2019

Episode 12
Original airdate: 14 November 2019

Ratings

References

2019 Australian television seasons
Australian (season 05)
Television shows filmed in Australia